Masterton Central is a suburb of Masterton, a town on New Zealand's North Island.

It consists of a central business district centred on Queen Street. Commercial activity on the street drifted south in the 1990s, but the northern end of the street experienced a resurgence in the 2000s. Plans for a redevelopment of the street were drawn up in 2016 and went through public consultation in 2017.

Demographics 

Masterton Central had a population of 711 at the 2018 New Zealand census, an increase of 105 people (17.3%) since the 2013 census, and an increase of 33 people (4.9%) since the 2006 census. There were 267 households. There were 348 males and 363 females, giving a sex ratio of 0.96 males per female. The median age was 40.7 years (compared with 37.4 years nationally), with 126 people (17.7%) aged under 15 years, 141 (19.8%) aged 15 to 29, 306 (43.0%) aged 30 to 64, and 138 (19.4%) aged 65 or older.

Ethnicities were 78.1% European/Pākehā, 28.3% Māori, 2.5% Pacific peoples, 7.6% Asian, and 3.4% other ethnicities (totals add to more than 100% since people could identify with multiple ethnicities).

The proportion of people born overseas was 14.8%, compared with 27.1% nationally.

Although some people objected to giving their religion, 54.0% had no religion, 32.1% were Christian, 1.3% were Hindu, 1.3% were Muslim, 0.8% were Buddhist and 3.4% had other religions.

Of those at least 15 years old, 72 (12.3%) people had a bachelor or higher degree, and 147 (25.1%) people had no formal qualifications. The median income was $23,700, compared with $31,800 nationally. The employment status of those at least 15 was that 261 (44.6%) people were employed full-time, 87 (14.9%) were part-time, and 36 (6.2%) were unemployed.

Education

References

Suburbs of Masterton
Central business districts in New Zealand